Kyle David Whittingham (born November 21, 1959) is an American football coach and former player. He is the head football coach at the University of Utah, a position he has held since 2005, and is the all-time leader in wins at Utah. Prior to becoming the head coach at Utah, Whittingham served as Utah's defensive coordinator for ten seasons. He was named head coach of Utah after Urban Meyer left for the University of Florida in 2004. He won AFCA Coach of the Year and the Paul "Bear" Bryant Award in 2008 after leading the 2008 Utah Utes football team to an undefeated season and a win in the 2009 Sugar Bowl over the 2008 Alabama Crimson Tide football team. He and  Oklahoma State’s Mike Gundy are the second longest tenured  FBS coaches (with one school), trailing only Kirk Ferentz. He is the longest tenured head coach in the PAC-12.

Playing career
Whittingham played linebacker for the BYU Cougars from 1978 to 1981. In 1981, he earned first-team all-WAC and WAC Defensive Player of the Year honors. Whittingham was also named the defensive MVP of the 1981 Holiday Bowl. He played in all of the first four Holiday Bowls. In his first appearance, he played as a running back and the other three as a linebacker, during which he recorded 27 tackles. In 2009, he was inducted into the Holiday Bowl Hall of Fame.

He graduated from BYU in 1981 and went on to play linebacker for the Denver Gold and New Orleans Breakers of the USFL and the Calgary Stampeders of the CFL. He also played for the Los Angeles Rams' replacement squad in 1987.

Coaching career

Early coaching career
Whittingham became a graduate assistant for BYU during the 1985 and 1986 seasons. In 1987, Whittingham was named defensive coordinator at the College of Eastern Utah. He coached there for a season before taking a job at Idaho State. After five seasons with Idaho State, Whittingham joined the Utah staff as defensive line coach, working alongside his father, Fred Whittingham. In the 1995 season, Whittingham replaced his father as the defensive coordinator, who had been hired as the linebackers coach for the Oakland Raiders. Whittingham remained the defensive coordinator for ten years, serving under both Ron McBride and Meyer, until being named head coach in 2004.

Head coaching career
The 2004 season ended with Utah becoming the first BCS non-AQ conference team to make a BCS bowl game, the Fiesta Bowl. After winning the Fiesta Bowl, the Utes' overall record improved to 12–0. After the 2004 season, the Utes lost junior starting quarterback Alex Smith to the NFL and head coach Urban Meyer who left to the University of Florida. After the regular season, and before the Fiesta Bowl, Whittingham was offered the head coaching job at Utah and also the head coaching job at his alma mater, Brigham Young University. After struggling with the decision for four days he chose the Utes. Because Urban Meyer had already officially accepted the head coaching job at Florida before the Fiesta Bowl, Whittingham and Meyer acted as co-head coaches of the 2005 Fiesta Bowl. Utah and the NCAA credit the Fiesta Bowl to both Meyer and Whittingham.

2005

Whittingham's first season was an up and down ride for Utah as the team not only adjusted to a new coaching staff, including Andy Ludwig, but also a new offense led by quarterback Brian Johnson. Utah struggled early on, going 3–4 in their first 7 games, however, a strong finish gave Utah their third straight bowl invite.

In the 2005 Emerald Bowl the Utes faced the Georgia Tech Yellow Jackets. Utah beat Georgia Tech 38–10, the Yellow Jackets' worst bowl loss by point margin in school history. Whittingham finished his first year at Utah with a 7–5 record.

2006

In 2006, Whittingham's team faced a degree of adversity. Starting quarterback Brett Ratliff struggled through parts of the year, and so did the Utes. Like the year before, the Utes rebounded toward the end of the season, but lost to rival BYU at home by a score of 33–31. The Utes became bowl eligible for the fourth straight year, a school record.  Whittingham led the Utes to a 25–13 victory over the University of Tulsa in the 2006 Armed Forces Bowl, running his record to 15–10 (.600) with Utah.

2007

2007 would provide more adversity. In Johnson's first start since 2005, he broke his collarbone against Oregon State and starting running back Matt Asiata broke his leg as Utah got routed 24–7 by the Beavers. The following week, wide receiver Brent Casteel was lost for the season in an embarrassing 20–12 loss at home to Air Force.

Utah looked as if it righted the ship the following week with a 44–6 rout of No. 9 UCLA, the highest-ranked team ever defeated by the Utes. But the following week represented the worst week of Whittingham's head coaching career—a 27–0 loss to perennial cellar-dweller UNLV that had many wondering if Whittingham could survive as a head coach at Utah.

But like past seasons, the Utes regrouped and won seven consecutive games, using a stingy, big-play defense and the sledgehammer running attack of Darrell Mack (253 carries, 1,204 yards and 16 total touchdowns), who had been scheduled to redshirt in what was going to be his junior season.  The Utes 50–0 drubbing of Wyoming proved controversial.  Up 43–0 in the second half, Whittingham decided to go for an onside kick.  An emotional Joe Glenn was caught on camera giving Whittingham the bird after the play.  In the season finale, Utah suffered its second consecutive loss to rival BYU to end the regular season, 17–10.

Whittingham and Utah overcame that disappointment to beat Navy, 35–32, in the 2007 Poinsettia Bowl.  It marked the Utes' seventh consecutive bowl victory, which placed them second to Boston College in longest active bowl winning streaks.

2008

In 2008, Utah completed an undefeated regular season and qualified for the 2009 Sugar Bowl.  Along the way were wins at Michigan, late come-from-behind wins over Oregon State and TCU, and a convincing victory over rival BYU.  Overall, Utah finished the regular season holding wins over three teams in the final AP Top 25.

Utah defeated Alabama, 31–17, in the Sugar Bowl, completing the fifth undefeated and untied season in school history.

The American Football Coaches Association selected Whittingham as the 2008 AFCA National Coach of the Year Award. The announcement was made at the football coaches' convention, which Whittingham attended. The AFCA award is the oldest national coach of the year award, dating back to 1935, and is the only one chosen exclusively by the coaches.

He also won the 2008 Paul "Bear" Bryant Award.

The team was selected national champion by Anderson & Hester, MCFR, and W postseason polls.

2009

In 2009, Utah had its second consecutive 10-win season. They finished with a 10–3 (6–2 MWC) record and a 37–27 win over California in the 2009 Poinsettia Bowl. Whittingham helped the Utes reach these benchmarks with two new coordinators: Dave Schramm as the offensive coordinator and Kalani Sitake as the defensive coordinator. Utah's three losses came against teams that finished the season ranked: Oregon, TCU, and BYU who finished the season ranked No. 11, 6, and 12 in the AP Poll, respectively. Utah finished ranked No. 18 in both the AP Poll and the Coaches' Poll.

2010

Kyle Whittingham turned down the head coaching position at Tennessee early in 2010.

Utah started the 2010 season with an upset of then-15th ranked Pittsburgh. The Utes then managed the third 8–0 start in program history, rising to fifth in the BCS rankings. However, during a 68–27 victory over Iowa State, Utah quarterback Jordan Wynn injured his arm and though he continued to play, the injury impacted the remainder of the season. After that 8–0 start, the Utes stumbled badly at home against the TCU Horned Frogs, lost a sloppy contest to Notre Dame and then bounced back to end the regular season with victories over San Diego State and rival Brigham Young University.

Due to the injury, Wynn, who finished the regular season in spite of his injury, missed the Las Vegas Bowl – a 26–3 loss to the Boise State Broncos. It was the program's first bowl loss since the 1996 Copper Bowl and snapped a 9-game bowl winning streak, which was, at the time, the longest active streak in college football.

The Utes finished the 2010 campaign 10–3 and 23rd in the nation. It marked the first time in program history that Utah produced three consecutive ten-win seasons.

2011

In its inaugural season in the Pac-12 Conference, Utah finished with an 8–5 record (4–5 Pac-12).

2016

On January 29, 2016, The University of Utah announced Whittingham had agreed to a contract extension through the 2020 season. The contract will pay Whittingham $3.3 million per year. This came on the heels of Whittingham surging past McBride to become the second-winningest coach in school history, behind only Ike Armstrong.

2020

His contract was renewed through 2027 at around $5 million per year.

2021

With a 38–7 victory over third-ranked Oregon, Whittingham became the winningest coach in University of Utah football program history with 142 victories. His total eclipsed that of legendary coach Ike Armstrong, who amassed 141 wins from 1925 to 1949.

Personal life
Whittingham was born on November 21, 1959, in San Luis Obispo, California. His father, Fred Whittingham, played linebacker professionally for nine years and then coached at the college and the pro level for almost twenty years.

Whittingham graduated from BYU with a bachelor's degree in educational psychology in 1982. In 1983, he married the former Jamie Daniels.  Whittingham then earned a master's degree in professional leadership in 1986.  Whittingham and his wife have four children. Alex Whittingham, Tyler Whittingham, Melissa Whittingham, and Kylie Whittingham.

Whittingham is a member of the Church of Jesus Christ of Latter-day Saints. Whittingham is an avid skier, tennis player, and golfer. He excels at all three according to Kirk Herbstreit.

Philanthropy
In 2008, Whittingham and former Utah head coach Urban Meyer were the first people to donate money to the Elder Joseph B. Wirthlin Family Scholarship, an endowed scholarship which benefits the football program.

Head coaching record

* Whittingham was co-head coach with Urban Meyer at the Fiesta Bowl. Utah credits the Fiesta Bowl to both Meyer and Whittingham.

References

External links

 Utah profile

1959 births
Living people
American Latter Day Saints
People from San Luis Obispo, California
Players of American football from California
Sportspeople from Provo, Utah
Players of American football from Utah
American football linebackers
BYU Cougars football players
Denver Gold players
Boston/New Orleans/Portland Breakers players
Los Angeles Rams players
National Football League replacement players
Coaches of American football from California
Coaches of American football from Utah
BYU Cougars football coaches
Idaho State Bengals football coaches
Utah Utes football coaches